Nadine Rohr (born 29 June 1977) is a Swiss pole vaulter.

She finished thirteenth at the 2001 Summer Universiade, won the bronze medal at the 2003 Summer Universiade and the silver medal at the 2005 Summer Universiade. She also competed at the 2002 European Championships, the 2004 Olympic Games and the 2005 World Championships without reaching the final.

Her personal best throw is 4.30 metres, achieved in August 2003 in Baden. This is the current Swiss record.

Competition record

References

1977 births
Living people
Swiss female pole vaulters
Athletes (track and field) at the 2004 Summer Olympics
Olympic athletes of Switzerland
Universiade medalists in athletics (track and field)
Universiade silver medalists for Switzerland
Universiade bronze medalists for Switzerland
Medalists at the 2003 Summer Universiade
Medalists at the 2005 Summer Universiade